Warburg Micro syndrome (WARBM), also known as Spastic Paraplegia 69 (SPG69) or RAB18 Deficiency, is a rare autosomal recessive genetic disorder characterized by congenital cataract, hypotonia, spastic diplegia, intellectual or developmental disability, microcephaly, microcornea, optic atrophy, and hypogenitalism.

Genetics
Warburg Micro is autosomal recessive, which means two copies of an abnormal gene must be present for the disorder to appear. Warburg Micro is caused by mutations in any of the following genes: RAB18, RAB3GAP1, RAB3GAP2 and TBC1D20

Diagnosis
Warburg Micro syndrome is diagnosed by genetic testing. It should be suspected when cataracts are present at birth and developmental delays are noted.

Treatment 
There is no specific treatment for Warburg Micro syndrome, but there are ways to help the symptoms that come with it. Congenital cataracts should be operated in the first two months. Physical and occupational therapy should begin as soon as possible. Medication can treat seizures, spasticity, and digestive issues. Orthotics like braces and assistive devices like standers and wheel chairs can improve bone health, spasticity, and mobility. Specialists can perform surgeries to address hip and spine health. Therapeutics trials in other forms of early onset hereditary spastic paraplegia are ongoing and include cholesterol lowering drugs, antioxidants, potassium channel blockers, MGLL inhibitors among others. More understanding of the overlapping mechanisms of these disorders and Warburg Micro is required to understand whether they may some day be applicable in SPG 69.

References 

Autosomal recessive disorders
Syndromes with craniofacial abnormalities
Rare syndromes